Stjenka Rasin is a 1936 German historical drama film directed by Alexandre Volkoff and starring Wera Engels, Hans Adalbert Schlettow and Heinrich George.  It was shot at the Babelsberg Studios in Berlin. The film's sets were designed by the art directors Gustav A. Knauer and Alexander Mügge. It is also known by the alternative title Wolga, Wolga.

Synopsis
The plot revolves around the Cossack Stenka Razin who led a peasant uprising against the Tsarist authorities in seventeenth century Russia.

Cast
 Wera Engels as Prinzessin Dolgoruki
 Hans Adalbert Schlettow as 	Stjenka Rasin
 Heinrich George as 	Fürst Dolgoruki
 Anton Pointner as 	Fürst Prosorowsky
 Rudolf Platte as 	Filka
 Olaf Bach as 	Wasska
 Philipp Manning as 	Zar Alexey Michailowitsch
 Wolfgang Keppler as Jegorka
 Hubert von Meyerinck as	Borodin
 Hans Joachim Schaufuß as 	Nikolka

References

Bibliography 
 Rentschler, Eric. The Ministry of Illusion: Nazi Cinema and Its Afterlife. Harvard University Press, 1996.
 Klaus, Ulrich J. Deutsche Tonfilme: Jahrgang 1936. Klaus-Archiv, 1988.
 Waldman, Harry. Nazi Films in America, 1933-1942. McFarland, 2008.

External links 
 

1936 films
Films of Nazi Germany
1930s German-language films
Films directed by Alexandre Volkoff
1930s German films
German drama films
1936 drama films
Films set in the 17th century
Films set in Russia
German historical films
1930s historical films
Terra Film films
Films shot at Babelsberg Studios